HMS Juno was a J-class destroyer of the Royal Navy laid down by the Fairfield Shipbuilding and Engineering Company, Limited, at Govan in Scotland on 5 October 1937, launched on 8 December 1938 and commissioned on 25 August 1939. Juno participated in the Battle of Calabria  in July 1940 and the Battle of Cape Matapan in March 1941.

Construction
The eight ships of the J class were ordered on 25 March 1937, and Juno was laid down with the name Jamaica at Fairfield's Govan shipyard on 5 October 1937. The ship was renamed Juno in September 1938 and was launched on 8 December 1938. The ship was completed on 25 August 1939, and was commissioned with the pennant number F46.

As completed, Juno had a main gun armament of six  QF Mark XII guns in three twin mountings, two forward and one aft. These guns could only elevate to an angle of 40 degrees, and so were of limited use in the anti-aircraft role, while the aft mount was arranged so that it could fire forwards over the ship's superstructure to maximise the forward firing firepower, but was therefore incapable of firing directly aft. A short range anti-aircraft armament of a four-barrelled 2-pounder "pom-pom" anti-aircraft mount and eight .50 in machine guns in two quadruple mounts was fitted, while torpedo armament consisted of ten  torpedo tubes in two quintuple mounts. Anti-submarine armament consisted of two depth charge throwers and a single rack, with 20 depth charges carried, while the Two-Speed Destroyer Sweep (TSDS) minesweeping gear could also be carried.

Modifications
Early in the war, the aft 4.7-inch mount was modified to allow it to fire directly aft, while in mid-1941, the aft set of torpedo tubes was replaced by a single 4 inch (102 mm) Mk V anti-aircraft gun (although this gun was not provided with appropriate fire control and was therefore of limited use). Close-in armament was improved by replacing the .50 in machine guns with 4 single Oerlikon 20 mm cannon.

Service
The initial work-up of the ship and her crew was interrupted by the German invasion of Poland on 1 September 1939, and on 6 September 1939, Juno and sister ships  and  escorted the Norwegian steamer SS Batavia, carrying the staff of the British embassy in Berlin across the North Sea from Rotterdam to the Tongue lightship in the Thames estuary. She then resumed training and work up activities based at Devonport for the remainder of September, joining the 7th Destroyer Flotilla based on the Humber and operating off the east coast of Britain, with duties including patrols and escorting convoys. Juno and Jersey did not spot the two German ships, which launched 7 torpedoes, one of which hit Jersey. Juno in response, searched for a submarine, which was believed to have fired the torpedo, allowing the German destroyers to escape unchallenged. When it was realised that there was no submarine, Juno took Jersey under tow, taking the damaged destroyer to Immingham.

Juno continued in service with the 7th Flotilla until March 1940, with her service interrupted by a refit at Kingston upon Hull from 5 February to 2 March 1940 and by repairs to her feedwater tanks from 9 to 20 March. The German invasion of Norway in April 1940 saw  Juno operate with the Home Fleet in operations to oppose the invasion.

Attacked and sunk
Juno was attacked by an Italian CANT Z.1007 aircraft from 50th group, flown by Lt. Mario Morassutti, as she steamed with the Mediterranean Fleet against the German sea-borne invasion of Crete and sank 30 nautical miles south-east of Crete on 21 May 1941.

At the time of her sinking Juno was commanded by Cdr. St. John Reginald Joseph Tyrwhitt and would have had a complement of 183 to 218 seamen and officers. It is believed that 116 crew lost their lives after 3 powerful explosions split Juno in two, sinking her in around 97 seconds.

Notes

References
 
 
 
 
 
  
 
 
 
 
 

 

J, K and N-class destroyers of the Royal Navy
Ships built in Govan
1938 ships
World War II destroyers of the United Kingdom
World War II shipwrecks in the Mediterranean Sea
Maritime incidents in May 1941
Ships sunk by aircraft during the Battle of Crete
Ships sunk by Italian aircraft